Heeria is a monotypic genus of flowering plants belonging to the family Anacardiaceae. The only species is Heeria argentea.

It is native to the South African Republic, mainly the Cape Provinces.
The genus name of Heeria is in honour of Oswald Heer (1809–1883), a Swiss geologist and naturalist.  The Latin specific epithet of argentea refers to silvery.
Heeria argentea was first described and published in Pl. Vasc. Gen. Vol.2 on page 55 in 1837.

References

Anacardiaceae
Plants described in 1837
Flora of the Cape Provinces